Rakel Liehu (born 3 September 1939) is a Finnish poet, dramatist and novelist.

Works
Liehu began writing poetry at the age of 11, inspired by the works of women poets such as Aila Meriluoto, and has since gone on to publish 13 poetry collections.

She has also authored three novels, as well as two plays and various scripts.

Her debut poetry collection, Ihmisen murhe on yhteinen ( 'The Grief of a Person is Shared'), came out in 1974, and her first novel, Seth Mattsonin tarina ('The Story of Seth Mattson'), in 1976.

Her perhaps best-known work is Helene (2003), a novel about the life of the Finnish artist Helene Schjerfbeck, which won the 2004 Runeberg Prize. It formed the basis of the 2020 film by the same name, directed by Antti Jokinen and starring Laura Birn as Schjerfbeck, which was nominated for an award in the feature-length category at the Shanghai International Film Festival.

Her latest novel, Valaanluiset koskettimet (2020) ('Whale Bone Keys') is strongly autobiographical.

Her other notable works include the novel Punainen ruukku ('Red Pot') (1980), and the essay collection Sininen kala ('Blue Fish') (1999).

Awards and honours
In 2004, Liehu won the Runeberg Prize with Helene.

In 2006, she was awarded the  medal of the Order of the Lion of Finland.

In 2008, Liehu received the Finnish State Literature Prize.

Personal life
Aged five, Rakel Liehu contracted pneumonia, which killed her younger sister. She herself survived, but suffered from resultant ill health all her childhood, missing much of school while needing to convalesce; it was during that time that she became interested in poetry.

Liehu graduated from the University of Helsinki in 1963, after which she worked briefly as a teacher of Finnish and history at a secondary school in Raahe.

She was married until the death of her husband in 2008, with three children. Liehu lives in the Kruununhaka district of central Helsinki.

References

Finnish poets
Finnish women poets
Finnish women writers
Finnish dramatists and playwrights
Finnish women dramatists and playwrights
Finnish novelists
Finnish women novelists
People from Nivala
1939 births
University of Helsinki alumni
Living people
Pro Finlandia Medals of the Order of the Lion of Finland